Lwandiswa Zuma (born 11 July 1996) is a South African first-class cricketer. He was included in the Free State cricket team squad for the 2015 Africa T20 Cup. In September 2018, he was named in KwaZulu-Natal Inland's squad for the 2018 Africa T20 Cup. In April 2021, he was named in North West's squad, ahead of the 2021–22 cricket season in South Africa.

References

External links
 

1996 births
Living people
South African cricketers
Free State cricketers
KwaZulu-Natal Inland cricketers
Cricketers from Pietermaritzburg